Herrmann Gustav Karl Max von Fabeck (6 May 1854 – 16 December 1916) was a Prussian military officer and a German General der Infantarie during World War I. He commanded the 13th Corps in the 5th Army and took part in the Race to the Sea on the Western Front and also commanded the new 11th Army on the Eastern Front. Subsequently, he commanded several German armies during the war until his evacuation from the front due to illness in 1916 and died on 16 December. A competent and highly decorated commander, von Fabeck is a recipient of the Pour le Mérite, Prussia's and Germany's highest military honor.

Life 
Fabeck was born in Berlin in 1854, when it was the capital of the Kingdom of Prussia. He was the son of Prussian Lieutenant-General Hermann von Fabeck (1816–1873) and wife Bertha, née von dem Borne (1829–1910). By the time he was 17 years old he was already a second lieutenant in the 1st Footguards Regiment. From 1878 to 1879 he attended the Prussian Military Academy. In 1882 he was appointed to the German General Staff and was promoted to captain in 1884. From 1886 he served in the General Staff of the 28. Division in Karlsruhe.

On 24 October 1887 married Helene von Seldeneck (born 7 October 1863 in Karlsruhe, † 13 July 1938 in Cologne), the daughter of William and Julie (nee Brandt Von Lindau) von Seldeneck, chamberlain of the Grand Duke of Baden. The couple had four daughters Ilse, Maria, Margaret, and Hildegard.

He became a staff officer to the VI Army Corps in Breslau in 1889 and shortly thereafter was promoted to Major. From 1893 he served in the regiment Grenadier König Friedrich Wilhelm II. (1. Schlesisches ) Nr. 10  in Schweidnitz. In 1896 he was a Lieutenant Colonel Chief of Staff of the XI. Army Corps in Kassel. In 1898 he was promoted to Colonel and received his first command: the Infanterie-Regiments „Herzog Friedrich Wilhelm von Braunschweig“ (Ostfriesisches) Nr. 78 in Osnabrück. From 1901 he led the 25th Infantry Brigade in the 13th Army Division in Münster. He was promoted to Major General that same year.

In 1906 Fabeck was promoted to lieutenant general and commander of the 28th Army Division in Karlsruhe. In 1910 he was appointed general of the infantry and commanding general of the XV Army Corps in Strasbourg. In 1913 he assumed the same position at the XIII (Royal Württemberg) Army Corps in Stuttgart. He met Fritz von Loßberg as the chief of staff. Loßberg helped Fabeck to have a united staff officers before the war.

World War I 
At the beginning of World War, the XIII Army Corps commanded by von Fabeck was part of Germany's 5th Army which was commanded by Crown Prince Wilhelm. It participated in the mobile battles known as the Race to the Sea. During the First Battle of Ypres, Fabeck made his move with newly formed 5 divisions with backups of heavy reserve artillery. It was job of I Corps to fight back them. In March 1915 von Fabeck briefly commanded the newly formed 11th Army, which was quickly transferred from the Western to the Eastern fronts with whom he fought in Lithuania. In April 1915 he replaced the injured Alexander von Kluck as commander of the 1st Army. In September 1915 von Fabeck got command of the 12th Army, with whom he transferred to the Eastern Front. He was also attached à la suite to Infanterie-Regiment Nr. 129 on 27 January 1916. Before he fell ill in October 1916 von Fabeck was the commander of 8th Army for a few weeks.

General von Fabeck was awarded the Pour le Mérite for outstanding military leadership during the 1914–15 campaigns in Flanders and northern France,
as well as in recognition of successful operational planning in the battles at Mons, Le Cateau and the Ourcq river. He received a personal telegram from the Wilhelm II congratulating him on the award.

Death 
In October 1916 von Fabeck became seriously ill and he committed suicide on 16 December 1916 at Partenkirchen, Kingdom of Bavaria.

Awards 
 Grand Cross of the Order of the Crown of Württemberg
 Grand Cross of the Order of the Zähringer Lion
 Bavarian Military Merit Order
 Grand Cross of the Order of Philip the Magnanimous
 Grand Cross of the Order of Red Eagle with Oak Leaves 
 Order of the Crown of Prussia, 1st class 
 Prussian Service Award Cross
 Grand Cross of the Albert Order with Gold Star 
 Commander of the Order of the Crown of Italy
 Grand Cross of the Order of the Crown of Romania
 Iron Cross (1914), 1st and 2nd class
 Commander of the Military Merit Order of Württemberg on 1 November 1914 
 Pour le Mérite 23 August 1915

Dates of ranks
 Fähnrich—1 October 1871
 Leutnant—18 October 1871
 Oberleutnant—18 October 1879
 Hauptmann—12 July 1884
 Major—19 November 1889
 Oberstleutnant—27 January 1896
 Oberst—24 May 1898
 Generalmajor—14 November 1901
 Generalleutnant—27 January 1906
 General der Infanterie—13 January 1910

References

Literature 
 Holger Afflerbach: Kaiser Wilhelm II. als oberster Kriegsherr im Ersten Weltkrieg. Quellen aus der militärischen Umgebung des Kaisers 1914–1918 Deutsche Geschichtsquellen des 19. und 20. Jahrhunderts, Band 64. (München: Oldenbourg, 2005) 
 Ian F. W. Beckett: Ypres. The First Battle, 1914. (Harlow: Pearson/Education, 2004) 
 Robert T. Foley: German Strategy and the Path to Verdun. Erich Falkenhayn and the development of Attrition 1870–1916 (Cambridge University Press, 2005)

External links 
 Stammbaum
 Familiengeschichte mit Kurzbiografie und Foto
 Stollwerck-Sammelbild mit Kurzbiografie

1854 births
1916 deaths
Military personnel from Berlin
People from the Province of Brandenburg
German Army generals of World War I
Generals of Infantry (Prussia)
German military personnel who committed suicide
Recipients of the Iron Cross (1914), 1st class
Recipients of the Pour le Mérite (military class)
Recipients of the Military Merit Order (Bavaria)
Grand Crosses of the Order of the Crown (Romania)